Three Men in a Boat is a 1933 British comedy film directed by Graham Cutts and starring William Austin, Edmund Breon, Billy Milton and Davy Burnaby. It is based on the 1889 novel Three Men in a Boat by Jerome K. Jerome which depicts three men and a dog's adventure during a boat trip along the River Thames.

Cast
 William Austin as Harris
 Edmund Breon as George
 Billy Milton as Jimmy
 Davy Burnaby as Sir Henry Harland
 Iris March as Peggy
 Griffith Humphreys as Sergeant
 Stephen Ewart as Doctor
 Victor Stanley as Cockney
 Frank Bertram as Fisherman
 Sam Wilkinson as Police Constable
 Winifred Evans as Lady Harland

References

Bibliography
 Low, Rachael. Filmmaking in 1930s Britain. George Allen & Unwin, 1985.
 Perry, George. Forever Ealing. Pavilion Books, 1994.

External links

Three Men in a Boat at BFI Database

1933 films
British comedy films
1933 comedy films
Films directed by Graham Cutts
Seafaring films
Films set in England
Films shot in England
Films based on works by Jerome K. Jerome
Associated Talking Pictures
British black-and-white films
1930s English-language films
1930s British films